Second Reality (originally titled Unreal ] [ - The 2nd Reality) is an IBM PC compatible demo created by Future Crew. It debuted at the Assembly 1993 demoparty on July 30, 1993, where it was entered into the PC demo competition, and finished in first place with its demonstration of 2D and 3D computer graphics rendering.  The demo was released to the public in October 1993. It is considered to be one of the best demos created during the early 1990s on the PC; in 1999 Slashdot voted it one of the "Top 10 Hacks of All Time". Its source code was released in a GitHub repository as public domain software using the Unlicense on the 20th anniversary of the release on 1 August 2013.

Demo description 
Many techniques used by other demos, including Future Crew's own earlier work, were refined and reused in Second Reality. The demo had a soundtrack of Techno music composed by Skaven and Purple Motion using ScreamTracker 3. The degree of synchronization of the visuals with the music was highly impressive for its time.

Hidden part 
The demo can be started with a single character command line argument "2" through "5" to start from any of the later four parts.

For another part that its introductory text calls "just an experiment" start the demo with a command line argument of "u". The screen will start filling with ever more stars warping towards the screen.

Technical characteristic 
In 2013 a reverse engineering analysis of SR with the now available source code revealed a design which is built around two characteristical demoscene paradigms: Teamwork and Obfuscation.

Internally the demo consists of 23 separated parts which allowed independent, parallel development and free selection of programming language (assembly, C and Turbo Pascal) and development tools.

The analysis of the source code also revealed that the long-standing and popular speculation that SR uses its own memory manager which accesses the MMU directly is not true; in fact SR uses standard DOS memory management functions.

Running the demo 
The demo runs best on an Intel 80486 PC with a Gravis Ultrasound or a Sound Blaster Pro (or register-compatible clone). As the demo had in the original released version a slow down bug, a patch was released later.

While the demo code remains freely available on numerous Internet sites and is now hosted with source code on GitHub, it is difficult or impossible to run Second Reality directly on a modern PC.  The demo accesses video and sound hardware directly (using its own built-in device drivers) which is incompatible with current OSs, and many of the timings in the demo do not scale up to modern CPU speeds.

To run this demo (with minor glitches) on a modern machine running a modern OS like Windows or Linux, one can use DOSBox.  DOSBox is capable of emulating the exotic video modes and the Gravis Ultrasound preferred by Second Reality, and can be configured to the 33 MHz recommended on the demo's configuration screen for optimal viewing.

Legacy

Later uses of soundtrack 
 Children of Bodom used the introduction music for the first track of Ubiquitous Absence Of Remission when they were known as Inearthed.
 The introduction music was used in the Tripomatic Remix By Sels "Franky Jones" F., of Are You Ready? by Overdog, released on Bonzai Records in 1996.
 The soundtrack of the demo was licensed for SHMUP, an iOS game.
 This song is featured in the album "Metropolis" (2011) in the tracks 2, 3 and 4.
 The soundtrack of this demo is used in the song "Persian Synthesizer" by Space (2018).

Remixes 
 Second Reality C64 (pouët.net) by Smash Designs – Probably the most well-known and  most impressive remix, being a faithful adaptation of the original demo for the Commodore 64 platform.
 Final Reality (pouët.net) by Remedy Entertainment – Although this is a commercial benchmarking software, one of the video scenes pays homage to the original demo's "3D spacecraft fly-through" part.
 Real Reality (pouët.net) by N.E.V.E.R. - A remix, which shows all parts of the demo being played in real life.
 Zecond Re@lity (pouët.net) by Zon@ Neutr@ - Also a "real life" remix, however, this one also features the original soundtrack being performed a cappella.
 Flash Reality (pouët.net) by The Scampers – A Macromedia Flash remix, with many scenes recreated using the Actionscript programming language.
 SHizZLE (Team Pokeme) – A demo on the Pokémon Mini, which contains some parts of Second Reality.
 Second Reality 2013 (pouët.net) by Checkpoint – remix for Atari ST
 8K Reality (pouët.net) by Fulcrum – a remix done in 8 kilobytes of executable PC code. Released at Revision 2015 demoparty where it was ranked second.  The two-dimension drawings were modelled using metaballs.
 Rocky Reality (pouët.net) by Bedrock Bros. - a port done for the Pebble Smartwatch. Released at Evoke 2016 demoparty where it was ranked second in the alternative platform category.
 Holo Reality (pouët.net) by Bedrock Bros. - a demake for the Looking Glass holographic display. Released at Demosplash 2018 demoparty where it was ranked first in the category "modern."
Second Realipony (pouët.net) by Equestrian Alicoders - funny ponyful remake with original music.
First Reality (pouët.net) by Holo Sapiens - 3d argumented reality.

References

External links 

 Second Reality demo download on scene.org
 Second Reality soundtrack in ScreamTracker 3 format (693 K)
 Second Reality source code on GitHub
 Video footage taken during the making of Second Reality , available on youtube.com and Internet Archive
 In-browser MSDOS emulation by the Internet Archive
  (HQ video from Pouet)

1993 software
Assembly language software
Demos
Formerly proprietary software
Public-domain software with source code
Software using the Unlicense license